This is a list of works by American author Michael Chabon.

Bibliography

Novels 
 The Mysteries of Pittsburgh (1988)
 Wonder Boys (1995)
 The Amazing Adventures of Kavalier & Clay (2000)
 The Final Solution (2004)
 The Yiddish Policemen's Union (2007)
 Gentlemen of the Road (2007)
 Telegraph Avenue (2012)
 Moonglow (2016)

Young adult
 Summerland (2002)

Short fiction 
Collections
 A Model World and Other Stories (1991)
 Werewolves in Their Youth (1999)

Stories
 "Citizen Conn" (The New Yorker 88/1; February 13&20, 2012)

Children's books 
 The Astonishing Secret of Awesome Man (illustrator: Jake Parker) (2011)

Comics 
 Julius Knipl, Real Estate Photographer: Stories by Ben Katchor (Introduction) (1996)
 JSA All Stars #7, "The Strange Case of Mr. Terrific and Doctor Nil" (writer) (2004)
 Michael Chabon Presents: The Amazing Adventures of the Escapist (comic book series published by Dark Horse Comics) (Numbers 1–8; the first six are also collected in three books, two numbers per volume) (2004–2005)
 The Escapists (six-issue comic book limited series published by Dark Horse Comics) (2006)
 Casanova: Acedia (Backup story with Matt Fraction) (illustrator: Gabriel Bá) (2015)

Non-fiction 
 Casting the Runes and Other Ghost Stories by M. R. James (Introduction) (2002)
 Maps and Legends (2008)
 Manhood for Amateurs (2009)
 Pops: Fatherhood in Pieces (2018)
 Bookends: Collected Intros and Outros (2019)

As editor 
 McSweeney's Mammoth Treasury of Thrilling Tales (editor and contributor) (2003)
 McSweeney's Enchanted Chamber of Astonishing Stories (editor) (2004)
 The Best American Short Stories 2005 (editor, with Katrina Kenison) (2005)

Filmography

Film 
 Spider-Man 2 (screen story, with Alfred Gough and Miles Millar) (2004)
 John Carter (screenplay, with Andrew Stanton and Mark Andrews) (2012)

Television

Discography

As songwriter

Footnotes 

Bibliographies by writer
Bibliographies of American writers